Chaetaglaea fergusoni, or Ferguson's sallow moth, is a moth in the family Noctuidae. It was described by Vernon Antoine Brou Jr. in 1997 and is found in North America.

The MONA or Hodges number for Chaetaglaea fergusoni is 9948.1.

References

 Crabo L, Davis M, Hammond P, Mustelin T, Shepard J (2013). "Five new species and three new subspecies of Erebidae and Noctuidae (Insecta, Lepidoptera) from Northwestern North America, with notes on Chytolita Grote (Erebidae) and Hydraecia Guenée (Noctuidae)". ZooKeys 264: 85-123.
 Lafontaine D, Troubridge J (2010). "Two new species of the Euxoa westermanni species-group from Canada (Lepidoptera, Noctuidae, Noctuinae)". ZooKeys 39: 255–262.
 Lafontaine, J. Donald & Schmidt, B. Christian (2010). "Annotated check list of the Noctuoidea (Insecta, Lepidoptera) of North America north of Mexico". ZooKeys, vol. 40, 1–239.

Further reading

 Arnett, Ross H. (2000). American Insects: A Handbook of the Insects of America North of Mexico. CRC Press.

External links
 Butterflies and Moths of North America

Xylenini